is the fourth single by Bump of Chicken. The title track is from the album Jupiter.

Track listing
 (Fujiwara Motoo)
 (Fujiwara, Naoi Yoshifumi)
"Love" (Hidden track)

Personnel
Fujiwara Motoo — Guitar, vocals
Masukawa Hiroaki — Guitar
Naoi Yoshifumi — Bass
Masu Hideo — Drums

Chart performance

References

External links
天体観測 on the official Bump of Chicken website.

2001 singles
Bump of Chicken songs
2001 songs
Toy's Factory singles